Pijnacker is a town in the Dutch province of South Holland. It is bordered Zoetermeer to the north, by Nootdorp to the northwest, by Delfgauw to the southwest, by Rotterdam (specifically Overschie) to the south and by Berkel en Rodenrijs to the east.

Pijnacker was a separate municipality until 2002, when it merged with Nootdorp to form Pijnacker-Nootdorp, which is a part of Greater The Hague. However, Pijnacker does not border The Hague (Nootdorp does), and it does border Rotterdam especially since Nootdorp and Pijnacker, while technically contiguous, have about 2 km of nature between them. While it may then seem strange that the two towns would want to merge, they did so preemptively to avoid potential annexing by the cities.

Pijnacker has two stops on the Randstadrail E-lijn between The Hague and Rotterdam: Pijnacker Centrum and Pijnacker-Zuid.

In and around Pijnacker there are big and attractive nature areas, of which one is the Ackerdijkse Plassen, one of the most important bird areas in the Netherlands.

Boroughs

 Centrum (Centre)
 Koningshof
 Noord (North)
 Klapwijk
 Tolhek
 Keijzershof
 Ackerswoude (partly build, not completed yet)
 Tuindershof (Hasn't been built yet)

Significant structures
One of the dominant buildings in Pijnacker is H. Joannes de Dooper Catholic church on the main street of town, the Oostlaan.  It is registered landmark, number 525173.  Though once it was a parish with a full-time priest, the Church of Saint John the Baptist (Pijnacker) is now joined with the Church of Saint Bartholomew (Nootdorp) to form one parish within the "Parish Federation of Oostland" within the Roman Catholic Diocese of Rotterdam.

Notable residents
Mabel Wisse Smit
Tarik Z., fake gunman
Kurt Wubben

See also
Ruiven

References

External links

Daily News from pijnacker

Municipalities of the Netherlands disestablished in 2002
Populated places in South Holland
Former municipalities of South Holland
Pijnacker-Nootdorp